The 2001 Brickyard 400, the 8th running of the event, was a NASCAR Winston Cup Series race held on August 5, 2001 at Indianapolis Motor Speedway in Speedway, Indiana. Contested at 160 laps on the 2.5 mile (4.023 km) speedway, it was the twenty-first race of the 2001 NASCAR Winston Cup Series season. Jeff Gordon of Hendrick Motorsports won the race.

Background

The Indianapolis Motor Speedway, located in Speedway, Indiana, (an enclave suburb of Indianapolis) in the United States, is the home of the Indianapolis 500 and the Brickyard 400. The track's turns are banked at 9 degrees, while the front stretch, the location of the finish line, has no banking. The back stretch, opposite of the front, also has a zero degree banking. The racetrack has seats for more than 250,000 spectators.

Top 10 results

Race statistics
 Time of race: 3:03:30
 Average Speed: 
 Pole Speed: 179.666
 Cautions: 7 for 28 laps
 Margin of Victory: 0.943 sec
 Lead changes: 18
 Percent of race run under caution: 17.5%         
 Average green flag run: 16.5 laps

Brickyard 400
Brickyard 400
NASCAR races at Indianapolis Motor Speedway